French Forum is a peer-reviewed academic journal. It covers research about French and Francophone literature and film. It is published by the University of Pennsylvania Press. The editor-in-chief is Philippe Met.

Overview
The journal was established by Virginia and Raymond La Charité in 1975. It is produced by the French Section of the Department of Romance Languages at the University of Pennsylvania.

Articles are both in English and French. It uses The Chicago Manual of Style.

References

Publications established in 2001
Multilingual journals
University of Nebraska System
University of Pennsylvania
Triannual journals
Literary magazines published in the United States
Film studies journals
University of Pennsylvania Press academic journals